Stefan Valentini (born 15 July 1996) is an  Australian footballer who plays as a striker for Avondale FC. Previously he played for Eintracht Braunschweig II, in the Regionalliga Nord, Germany. Born in Perth, Valentini holds a dual citizenship due to his Italian heritage.

Youth career
Valentini was named National Premier Leagues Western Australia Under 20 Player of the Year (2014) after playing only 12 games of the season and netting 12 goals for Balcatta FC.

Senior career
On 11 August 2015, he made his professional senior debut for Perth Glory in the 2015 FFA Cup against Newcastle Jets, coming off the bench and winning a penalty to give Glory a 2–1 lead to then scoring a penalty in the penalty shoot-out to advance to the next round of the FFA Cup. Valentini was an unused substitute in the 0–2 loss to Melbourne Victory in the 2015 FFA Cup Final.

Valentini won the Dylan Tombides Young Player of the Year award at the conclusion of the 2015 NPL season, after playing only 14 matches.

In January 2016, he joined the reserve side of Eintracht Braunschweig in the Regionalliga Nord.
On 19 July 2017, he joined TuS Erndtebruck in the Regionalliga West on a free transfer.

In January 2019, Valentini joined National Premier Leagues Victoria side Avondale FC, scoring on his second start for the club.

References

Living people
1996 births
Association football forwards
Australian soccer players
Australian expatriate soccer players
Perth Glory FC players
Eintracht Braunschweig II players
Regionalliga players
National Premier Leagues players